Deer blood is used as a nutritional supplement in some parts of the world, particularly in East Asia.

It is often freeze dried to preserve its viability as an ingestible substance, but only after it is sterilized to eradicate biological health threats (such as bacterial infection and parasites, that may reside in the blood while the deer is alive).

Freeze dried deer blood is a dark red powder with a high iron content, and is high in protein.

Sources 

In the Eastern Hemisphere, deer blood is sold as a commercial product.

In the Western Hemisphere, it is reported that some hunters drink the blood of the first deer they ever kill (such an instance was popularized in the 1984 American film Red Dawn.)

See also 
 Deer penis
 Deer antlers

References 

Hunting